The Flin Flon greenstone belt, also referred to as the Flin Flon – Snow Lake greenstone belt, is a Precambrian greenstone belt located in the central area of Manitoba and east-central Saskatchewan, Canada (near Flin Flon). It lies in the central portion of the Trans-Hudson orogeny and was formed by arc volcanism during the Paleoproterozoic period. The Flin Flon – Snow Lake greenstone belt is 250 km long by 75 km wide and is exposed just north of McClarty Lake. The belt is bounded by metasedimentary gneisses and metavolcanics of the Kisseynew Domain to the north and extends to the south where it is unconformably overlain by Ordovician age dolomite.

Economic geology
"The Flin Flon – Snow Lake belt is one of the most prolific mining belts in the world. A multitude of base and precious metal deposits of various sizes have been found in this relatively small area, some 250 km long and 45 km wide. There have been 25 operating mines in this area starting with the Mandy Mine,
which first went into production in 1916. Most of these mines produce copper–zinc and associated precious metals, although at least three produced principally gold and silver."

See also

General topics
Volcanism of Canada
Volcanism of Western Canada
Trans-Hudson orogeny
List of greenstone belts

Canadian provincial geology
Geography of Saskatchewan
Geography of Manitoba
Geology of Manitoba

References

Greenstone belts
Flin Flon
Volcanism of Manitoba
Volcanism of Saskatchewan
Paleoproterozoic volcanism
Precambrian Canada
Subduction zone volcanism